Telesail Technology Company, Limited, is a telecommunications equipment and systems company headquartered in Beijing, China, founded in 2005. The company provides Internet access, unified communications products and services.

Telesail core products include IP PBX, VoIP Access Gateway, Trunking gateway, VoIP phone, also including EPON optical line termination, EPON optical network units, planar lightwave circuit splitters and optical transceivers.

Telesail's customers are primarily Internet service providers and VoIP service operators . It is also an original equipment manufacturer that manufactures products which retail under other brand names.

See also
FTTx
Ethernet in the first mile (EFM)
Passive optical network
Fiber-optic communication

References

External links
 Official website

Companies based in Beijing
Manufacturing companies established in 2005
Manufacturing companies of China
Telecommunication equipment companies of China
Telecommunications equipment vendors